Riccardo Musetti (born 24 March 1983) is an Italian footballer.

Biography

Early career
Born in Carrara, Tuscany, Musetti started his professional career with his hometown club Carrarese. Musetti played his first league match on 16 May 1999. In June 1999 he was signed by Sampdoria along with Daniele Perrone.

In 2001, he was exchanged to Napoli in co-ownership deal along with Paolo Carbone, and Sampdoria signed Johan Michel Romeo and Roberto D'Auria. In June 2002 Napoli signed him outright.

Martina & Massese
In 2002–03 season he left for Martina and played  Serie C1 seasons. In January 2005 he left for Serie C2 club Imolese. In 2005, at first he left for Aglianese then signed by Chievo and farmed him to Massese in a co-ownership deal. In June 2006 Massese bought him outright.

Treviso
In June 2007, he was signed by Serie B club Treviso on a free transfer. In the first season he was loaned to Serie C1 club Pro Sesto. In 2008–09 Serie B season, he made his Serie B debut and scored 5 goals. The team finished as the bottom one and then went bankrupt.

Cremonese
In July 2009 he was signed by Lega Pro Prima Divisione club Cremonese. He scored 14 goals for the team as the team top-scorer in his maiden season, while his partners Massimo Coda and Massimiliano Guidetti scored 10 goals each. on 31 January 2011 Musetti left for Spezia.

As a Journeyman
Since 2013 he changed his employer each season. He was a player for Sorrento in 2013–14 season. In summer 2014 he moved to Romanian Liga II, but moving back to Carrarese in the same window by terminating the contract. However, the Romanian club did not file the transfer in time before the closure of Italian transfer window (on 1 September), thus Carrarese signed Antonio Di Nardo instead.

Musetti joined San Marino Calcio in January 2015. In summer 2015 he joined newly re-founded Parma for their 2015–16 Serie D season.

References

External links
 Football.it Profile 
 
 

Italian footballers
Serie B players
Carrarese Calcio players
U.C. Sampdoria players
A.S.D. Martina Calcio 1947 players
U.S. Massese 1919 players
Treviso F.B.C. 1993 players
S.S.D. Pro Sesto players
U.S. Cremonese players
Association football forwards
People from Carrara
1983 births
Living people
Sportspeople from the Province of Massa-Carrara
Footballers from Tuscany